Cortical desmoid (also called tug lesion or periosteal desmoid) is an irregularity of the distal femoral cortex caused by repetitive stress at the attachment of the adductor magnus aponeurosis. It is most commonly seen in adolescents and is usually asymptomatic. It is a benign and self-limiting lesion.

References 
 

Osteopathies